Tevin Farmer (born July 30, 1990) is an American professional boxer who held the IBF super featherweight title from 2018 to 2020. Farmer, who is right handed but fights in a southpaw stance, is known for his old school style and slick defensive skills.

Professional boxing career
Farmer started his boxing career when he was 19 admitting that in his early pro career he wasn't taking boxing seriously enough which lead to some early career losses.

However having have no losses on his record since his 12th fight in 2012 he earned his way to a world title shot and in his 31st professional bout in December 2017 he fought Kenichi Ogawa for the IBF super featherweight world title, which he lost at the time but it was later switched to a no contest due to the fact his opponent had tested positive in a drugs test pre fight.

Farmer travelled to Australia in August 2018 to land the title in the backyard of Sydney's Billy Dib. It was announced in August 2018 Tevin Farmer had signed a co promotional deal with Dibella Entertainment and Eddie Hearn's Matchroom Boxing USA with his first bout being aired on the new sports streaming platform DAZN. 

On 15 March, 2019, Tevin Farmer was slated to defend his IBF super featherweight title against Jono Carroll. Carroll proved to be a tough opponent and the fight was close. Farmer, however, would win the fight convincingly in all three judges' scorecards, who scored the fight 117-111, 117-111 and 117-110 in favor of the champion.

His fourth title defence came against Guillaume Frenois. Farmer had another convincing unanimous decision win, winning on all three scorecards, 119-108, 116-111 and 116-111.

On 30 January, 2020, Farmer defended his title against former title challenger Joseph Diaz Jr. Things went badly pretty early for Farmer, as after the first round he reported to his corner that he broke his hand. Diaz Jr took advantage of the situation and outboxed Farmer throughout most of the fight, earning the unanimous decision victory to win his first world title.

Personal life
Farmer's great uncle is Joe Gans who was the first ever native born black American to ever win a world title. In July 2017 Farmer suffered a career threatening injury when he was shot in the hand during an altercation at his nieces birthday party where he attempted to disarm the person holding the gun and was told by doctors he would never box again.

Professional boxing record

See also
List of world super-featherweight boxing champions

References

External links

Tevin Farmer - Profile, News Archive & Current Rankings at Box.Live

|-

|-

1990 births
Living people
American male boxers
African-American boxers
Boxers from Philadelphia
Lightweight boxers
Southpaw boxers
International Boxing Federation champions
World super-featherweight boxing champions